Elisolimax is a genus of air-breathing land snails or semislugs, terrestrial pulmonate gastropod mollusks in the family Helicarionidae.

Species
Species within the genus Elisolimax include:
 Elisolimax bella (Heynemann, 1882)
 Elisolimax flavescens
 Elisolimax madagascariensis (Poirier, 1887)
 Elisolimax rufescens Simroth

References

 
Helicarionidae
Taxonomy articles created by Polbot